Morihiro Saito (斉藤 守弘 Saitō Morihiro, March 31, 1928–May 13, 2002) was a teacher of the Japanese martial art of aikido, with many students around the world. Saito's practice of aikido spanned 56 years, from the age of 18, when he first met aikido founder Morihei Ueshiba, until his death in 2002.

Early life
Morihiro Saito was born in Ibaraki Prefecture, Japan, on 31 March 1928. Growing up in a poor farming village in the 1930s and early 40s, he recounted having the same interest in historical heroes such as Yagyū Jūbei Mitsuyoshi and Goto Matabe as most other Japanese boys. In the Japanese schools at that time, the martial arts of kendo and judo were taught to students, and Saito chose to study kendo.

In the years immediately following the end of World War II, the carrying of weapons of any kind, as well the practice of martial arts, was prohibited by the GHQ. As a result, Saito felt he should study some kind of unarmed self-defense technique, and began training in Shinto-ryū karate at the Shudokan in Meguro. After a short time, his work with the Japanese National Railways transferred him to Iwama, and he was forced to find other martial arts training. Thinking judo would be a useful complement to his kendo and karate skills, he began training at a judo dojo in Ishioka. In the summer of 1946, however, Saito heard stories about an "old man doing strange techniques up on the mountain near Iwama." It seemed that people were confused about what martial art, exactly, this old man was practicing, but one judo instructor said the man was teaching "Ueshiba-ryū Judo."

Meeting aikido's founder
By July 1946, the GHQ-imposed ban upon the practice of martial arts had forced Morihei Ueshiba into an official "retirement" from practice for several years. Ueshiba took this opportunity to seclude himself in the small town of Iwama, and was engaged in the practice of ascetic training (shugyō), and some believe that it was during this period that Ueshiba was perfecting the practice of aikido.

It was at this time, at the age of 18, that Saito joined Ueshiba for training, which already included then live-in students Kisshomaru Ueshiba, Koichi Tohei, and Tadashi Abe. This early training was quite brutal, but after persevering for several years, Saito became one of Ueshiba's closest students. Much credit is given to the fortuitous work schedule Saito had with the Japanese National Railways, where Saito worked 24 hours on, 24 hours off. As a result, Saito had the unique opportunity to train with Ueshiba in the practice of the sword and short staff, which occurred early each morning before the other students arrived.

Training

Training at the Iwama dojo consisted of a great deal of farmwork. The life of the full-time live in students consisted of prayer each morning before sunrise, two meals of rice porridge each day, and training interspersed with copious amounts of work on the farm. As a result of Saito's 24 hours on, 24 hours off, position with the National Railway meant that he would train and live as a live-in student only every other 24 hours. Eventually, the other live-in students moved away, and when Saito returned from work, he would train alone with Ueshiba.

Although other students such as Koichi Tohei trained with Ueshiba for more years than Saito did, Saito's work allowed him to train almost as an uchideshi, for long periods as the only student.

From 1946 until Ueshiba’s passing in 1969, Saito served as Ueshiba's assistant in a variety of ways at Iwama while his wife served Mrs. Ueshiba. During Saito’s period as a deshi he taught classes in the Iwama dojo.

Ueshiba's death

Before his death Ueshiba gave Morihiro Saito the responsibility of carrying on the teaching at the Iwama dojo and also the position of caretaker of the Aiki Jinja located in Iwama.

Training methodology and philosophy

Saito's instruction of aikido is particularly remembered for its emphasis upon the basics of aikido, and especially upon the relationship between the armed and unarmed aspects of the art.

Kazuo Chiba, a live-in student (uchideshi) of Ueshiba at the Aikikai Hombu Dojo in Tokyo, recalled in particular the intensity of the training that occurred at the Iwama dojo,

Chiba also emphasized Saito's focus upon , or vigorous practice without holding back, which Ueshiba taught and Saito demonstrated in his methods of teaching and practice. Apparently, this rigorous training with Saito, which Ueshiba would often observe, also included intense conditioning exercises, as well as general farmwork that students at the Iwama dojo were expected to assist with.

Other students of Saito attest to his commitment to carry on Ueshiba's legacy, and to follow and preserve Ueshiba's teachings as Saito had learned them. Saito believed that striking techniques (atemi) are a "vital element" of aikido, and also that the principles of swordsmanship formed the basis of aikido techniques. He also advocated training to cope with the attacks of other martial arts, such as the kicks practiced in karate.

According to Saito's son, Hitohiro Saito (now Hitohira), Saito believed that the basis of all empty-handed, sword, and staff techniques was the mastery of aikido's basic posture (hanmi). Saito believed that once the correct posture was mastered, the next step was to develop a proper kiai (sometimes translated as "spirit shout").

Legacy 
In the beginning of the 1970s, aikido students from outside Japan began traveling to Iwama to train under Saito. Later they would return to their native countries to teach what they had learned. There were also a small number of Japanese students of Saito who travelled abroad to teach Aikido, such as Takayasu-shihan.

The kind of aikido that Saito's students do is often referred to as Iwama aikido or Iwama style. In Europe, Saito, along with many of his students, formed a dan-ranking network of dojos called Iwama Ryu, with ranks received directly from Saito rather than or in addition to those from the Aikikai although Saito never left that organization.  Saito also awarded teaching certifications for Aiki-weapons (bokken and jo) internationally.  Receipt of the full set of five weapons certifications is considered the menkyo-kaiden.

Saito Sensei also inspired many around the world to establish dojo that focus on Iwama Style Aikido.  Some dojo, like Aikido in Fredericksburg, have full-time uchideshi programs based on what Saito Sensei developed at the Iwama Dojo.  Uchideshi can do short-term intensive studies (short stay) or long-term apprenticeships for a year or more to fully immerse in the training.

Saito family line 
After Saito's death, his son Hitohiro formed the independent . Some of the Iwama Ryu network dojos joined Hitohiro while others including some of Saito's longest students chose to remain affiliated with the Aikikai.

Hitohiro had already been the main instructor at Iwama dojo. Like the Aikikai Doshu, he does not claim a dan rank.

Senior (5th, 6th and 7th dan) Direct Students 

This short list was chosen based on several criteria including: the rank of the instructor, how long they studied directly with Saito (total time in Iwama), how long they were a student of Saito (total time since becoming his student) and how senior they are in their given region. 
This list shows the ranks Morihiro Saito personally awarded in his life (under both the Iwama Ryu and Aikikai systems).

Note: Morihiro Saito never awarded any 8th dan rankings. The highest ranks he delivered were the two Iwama Ryu 7th dan Shihan ranks that he awarded to Paolo Corallini (Italy) and Ulf Evenås (Sweden).

For some instructors the current rank is also shown, since some of them continued teaching through other organizations (i.e. Aikikai Tokyo or Iwama Shin Shin Aiki Shuren Kai, founded by Hitohiro Saito, Morihiro's son).

For example, the only 6th dan in a given country might be listed while one of many 6th/7th dans in another country is not even if the latter instructor is senior to the former.

Published works

Books

Film

References

External links
 Saitosensei.com
 Takemusu.org
 Budoka no Kotae – Talking to Morihiro Saito Sensei, Part 1
 Budoka no Kotae – Talking to Morihiro Saito Sensei, Part 2
 Budoka no Kotae – Talking to Morihiro Saito Sensei, Part 3

1928 births
2002 deaths
Japanese aikidoka